Flavio Paoletti (born 16 January 2003) is an Italian professional footballer who plays as a midfielder for Serie A club Sampdoria.

Club career
Born in San Benedetto del Tronto and raised in Colli del Tronto, Paoletti started playing football at local club Atletico Azzurra Colli, before joining Sampdoria's youth sector in the summer of 2017. He then progressed through the club's youth ranks, as he eventually became the captain of their under-19 squad, and then signed his first professional contract in September 2022.

During the 2022–23 season, Paoletti started training with Sampdoria's first team under head coach Dejan Stanković: then, on 8 January 2023, he made his professional debut with the club, coming on as a substitute for Ronaldo Vieira in the 83rd minute of a 2–0 Serie A loss to Napoli. Four days later, on 12 January, the midfielder made his first start in a professional game, together with team-mate Daniele Montevago, in a 1–0 Coppa Italia loss to Fiorentina.

International career
Paoletti has represented Italy at youth international level, having played for the under-17 national team.

Style of play 
Paoletti has been described as a versatile midfielder, who can play either in a more defensive role or as a mezzala, while also being able to cover in the center-back position.

He cited Dennis Praet as a source of inspiration.

Personal life 
Paoletti is a self-declared supporter of Sambenedettese, the main club based in his birthplace.

Career statistics

Club

References

External links
 
 
 FIGC Profile

2003 births
Living people
People from San Benedetto del Tronto
Italian footballers
Association football midfielders
Italy youth international footballers
U.C. Sampdoria players
Serie A players